USS Cinnabar (IX-163), a  designated an unclassified miscellaneous vessel, was the only ship of the United States Navy to be named for cinnabar.  Her keel was laid down in 1944. She was acquired on a loan-charter basis from the War Shipping Administration and placed in service at San Francisco, California, on 26 September 1944.

Service history
She was assigned to the Pacific Fleet, and in November 1944 departed the West Coast in tow for Pearl Harbor. With Service Squadron 8, and later Service Squadron 10, she issued general stores to advanced bases at Eniwetok, Espiritu Santo, Ulithi, Leyte, and was en route to Okinawa during the typhoon at sea 30 September to 2 October. On 9 October 1945 during Typhoon Louise she went aground at Baten Ko, Buckner Bay, Okinawa. She was stricken from the Naval Vessel Register on 3 January 1946, returned to her owner at Okinawa, and subsequently sold.

References 
 

 

Trefoil-class concrete barges
1944 ships